In the 2015 European Diving Championships, the winner of the gold medal in the women's 1-metre springboard event was the Italian diver Tania Cagnotto.

Medalists

Results

Green denotes finalists

2015 European Diving Championships
Euro